The Khorasan Steel Complex Company is an Iranian steel maker. It opened in the late 1980s, near Neyshabour and Firouzeh, Khorasan Razavi. It is Irans third largest steel producer and is directly controlled by the Ministry of Industries & Mines.

Products 
The company is made up of 16 units, including 4 direct reduction units, smelting, casting and rolling as the main and peripheral and support units.

See also 
Mining in Iran

References

External links
Official website

 

Steel companies of Iran
Iranian brands
Iranian entities subject to the U.S. Department of the Treasury sanctions